Elsa Rendschmidt (11 January 1886 – 9 October 1969) was a German figure skater and the first German woman to compete and win a medal at the Olympic Games.

Rendschmidt won the silver medal at the 1908 Summer Olympics, the first Olympics to include a ladies' figure skating event. She competed in the first ladies' German nationals, which took place in 1911. She skated for the Berliner Schlittschuhclub and won the event, becoming Germany's first ladies' champion. She also competed at the World Championships several times. Her best finish was 2nd (in 1908 and 1910).

A road located in Charlottenburg-Wilmersdorf was named after Rendschmidt in 2006.

Results

References

 Database Olympics

1886 births
1969 deaths
German female single skaters
Olympic figure skaters of Germany
Figure skaters at the 1908 Summer Olympics
Olympic silver medalists for Germany
Olympic medalists in figure skating
World Figure Skating Championships medalists
Medalists at the 1908 Summer Olympics